M68 or M-68 may refer to:

Roads
 M-68 (Michigan highway), a state highway in Michigan
 M68 (Johannesburg), a short metropolitan route in Johannesburg, South Africa
Proposed road numbering for a section of the road built as the M66 motorway in the United Kingdom, now part of the M60

Other uses
 M68 (Motorola 68000), a CISC microprocessor
 Miles M.68, a 4 engined development of Miles Aerovan
 Soltam M-68, a 1968 155 mm 33 calibre towed howitzer manufactured in Israel
 Messier 68, a globular cluster in the constellation Hydra
 M68 Close Combat Optic, referring to the Aimpoint CompM2 or its later version the Aimpoint CompM4
 M68 (tank gun)
 iPhone (1st generation), Apple's first mobile device, which was originally codenamed as "M68"
.